The 14 governorates of Syria, or muhafazat (sing. muhafazah), are divided into 65 districts, or manatiq (sing. mintaqah), including the city of Damascus. The districts are further divided into 281 subdistricts, or nawahi (sing. nahiya). Each district bears the same name as its district capital.

Districts and subdistricts are administered by officials appointed by the governor, subject to the approval of the minister of the interior. These officials work with elected district councils to attend to assorted local needs, and serve as intermediaries between central government authority and traditional local leaders, such as village chiefs, clan leaders, and councils of elders.

List of districts
The 65 districts are listed below by governorate (with capital districts in bold text). The city of Damascus functions as a governorate, a district and a subdistrict. Parts of Quneitra Governorate have been under Israeli occupation since 1967 (see Golan Heights).

Central Syria

Hama Governorate

 Hama District (4 sub-districts)
 Masyaf District (3 sub-districts)
 Mahardah District (5 sub-districts, a.k.a. Mhardeh, Muhardeh)
 Salamiyah District (5 sub-districts)
 Al-Suqaylabiyah District (5 sub-districts)

Homs Governorate

 Homs District (10 sub-districts)
 Al-Mukharram District (2 sub-districts)
 Al-Qusayr District (2 sub-districts)
 Ar-Rastan District (2 sub-districts)
 Tadmur District (2 sub-districts)
 Taldou District (3 sub-districts)*
 Talkalakh District (4 sub-districts)

* - a newly created district since 2010, formerly belonging to Homs District

Latakia Governorate

 Latakia District (7 sub-districts)
 Al-Haffah District (5 sub-districts)
 Jableh District (6 sub-districts)
 Qardaha District (4 sub-districts)

Tartus Governorate

 Tartus District (7 sub-districts)
 Baniyas District (7 sub-districts)
 Duraykish District (4 sub-districts)
 Safita District (6 sub-districts)
 Al-Shaykh Badr District (3 sub-districts)

North East Syria

Aleppo Governorate

 Mount Simeon District (7 sub-districts)*
 Afrin District (7 sub-districts)
 Atarib District (3 sub-districts)**
 Ayn al-Arab District (4 sub-districts)
 Azaz District (6 sub-districts)
 Al-Bab District (4 sub-districts)
 Dayr Hafir District (3 sub-districts)**
 Jarabulus District (2 sub-districts)
 Manbij District (5 sub-districts)
 Safirah District (5 sub-districts)

* - includes Aleppo City
** - a newly created district since 2008, formerly belonging to Mount Simeon District
*** - a newly created district since 2009, formerly belonging to Al-Bab District

Deir ez-Zor Governorate

 Deir ez-Zor District (7 sub-districts)
 Abu Kamal District (4 sub-districts)
 Mayadin District (3 sub-districts)

Al-Hasakah Governorate

 Al-Hasakah District (7 sub-districts)
 Al-Malikiyah District (3 sub-districts)
 Qamishli District (4 sub-districts)
 Ra's al-'Ayn District (2 sub-districts)

Idlib Governorate

 Idlib District (7 sub-districts)
 Arihah District (3 sub-districts)
 Harem District (6 sub-districts)
 Jisr al-Shughur District (4 sub-districts)
 Ma'arrat al-Numan District (6 sub-districts)

Raqqa Governorate

 Raqqa District (4 sub-districts)
 Tell Abyad District (3 sub-districts)
 Al-Thawrah District (3 sub-districts)

South West Syria

Damascus Governorate

 Damascus

Daraa Governorate

 Daraa District (8 sub-districts)
 Izra District (6 sub-districts)
 Al-Sanamayn District (3 sub-districts)

Quneitra Governorate

 Quneitra District (4 sub-districts)
 Fiq District (2 sub-districts)

Rif Dimashq Governorate

 Markaz Rif Dimashq District (6 sub-districts)
 Darayya District (3 sub-districts)
 Douma District (7 sub-districts; a.k.a. Duma)
 An-Nabek District (3 sub-districts; a.k.a. Al-Nabk)
 Qatana District (3 sub-districts)
 Qudsaya District (3 sub-districts)*
 Al-Qutayfah District (4 sub-districts)
 Al-Tall District (3 sub-districts)
 Yabroud District (2 sub-districts; a.k.a. Yabrud)
 Al-Zabadani District (3 sub-districts)

* - a newly created district since 2009, formerly belonging to Markaz Rif Dimashq District and parts of Al-Zabadani District

As-Suwayda Governorate

 As-Suwayda District (3 sub-districts)
 Salkhad District (5 sub-districts)
 Shahba District (4 sub-districts)

See also
 List of cities in Syria
 List of towns and villages in Syria
 Cities and towns during the Syrian Civil War

References

External links
Central Bureau of Statistics of Syria

 
Subdivisions of Syria
Syria, Districts
Syria 2
Districts, Syria
Syria geography-related lists